The 5th Africa Movie Academy Awards ceremony was held on April 4, 2009, at the Gloryland Cultural Center in Yenagoa, Bayelsa State, Nigeria, to honor the best African films of 2008. It was broadcast live on Nigerian national television. Africa Movie Academy Award winner Kate Henshaw-Nuttal and Nigerian stand-up comedian Julius Agwu hosted the ceremony. Numerous celebrities graced the event, including Timipre Sylva (the Governor of Bayelsa State) and Nollywood actresses and actors. Special guests were Academy Award winner Forest Whitaker and Hollywood actor Danny Glover.

The nominees were announced on March 3, 2009, during the 21st Pan African Film and Television Festival of Ouagadougou (FESPACO) by AMAA CEO Peace Anyiam-Osigwe. Approximately 403 entries from 54 African countries participated in the bid for an award.

With a total of twelve nominations, the Kenyan film From a Whisper led the nomination count, while Uganda's Battle of the Souls and South Africa's Gugu and Andile followed with ten nominations each. Nigeria's Arugba received nine nominations, Egypt's Seventh Heaven received eight nominations, followed closely by Ghana's Agony of the Christ with seven nominations.

From a Whisper won five awards, including Best Picture, Best Director (Wanuri Kahiu) and Best Soundtrack. Gugu and Andile landed the second spot with three awards. Battle of the Souls, Seventh Heaven, Small Boy, Arugba and Live to Remember each won two awards.

Winners

Major Awards 
The winners of the 23 Award Categories are listed first and highlighted in bold letters.

Additional awards

Films with multiple nominations
The following films received multiple nominations.

12 nominations
From a Whisper
10 nominations
Battle of the Soul
Gugu and Andile
9 nominations
Arugba
8 nominations
Seventh Heaven
7 nominations
Agony of the Christ
4 nominations
Cindy's Note
The Assassin
Jenifa

3 nominations
Beautiful Soul
Reloaded
Live to Remember
Apaadi
2 nominations
Grey Focus
Revolution
Five Apostles
Reloaded
Small Boy
Mah Sa-Sah
State of the Heart

Films with multiple awards
The following films received multiple awards.
5 awards
From a Whisper
3 awards
Gugu and Andile
2 awards
Arugba
Battle of the Soul
Seventh Heaven
Small Boy
Live to Remember

References

Africa Movie Academy Awards
Africa Movie Academy Awards
Africa Movie Academy Awards ceremonies
Award
Africa Movie Academy Awards